Live in San Francisco is a 2001 live album by instrumental rock solo artist Joe Satriani. Also available on DVD, including non-performance bonus footage (backstage, etc.).

Track listing
All songs by Joe Satriani except where noted.

Disc one

 "Time" – 8:10
 "Devil's Slide" – 4:44
 "The Crush of Love" (Satriani, John Cuniberti) – 5:04
 "Satch Boogie" – 5:28
 "Borg Sex" – 5:28
 "Flying in a Blue Dream" – 6:41
 "Ice 9" – 4:54
 "Cool #9" – 6:16
 "Circles" – 4:20
 "Until We Say Goodbye" – 5:36 
 "Ceremony" – 5:57
 "The Extremist" – 3:39
 "Summer Song" – 8:45

Disc two

 "House Full of Bullets" – 6:55
 "One Big Rush" – 4:06
 "Raspberry Jam Delta-V" – 6:53
 "Crystal Planet" – 6:02
 "Love Thing" – 3:48
 "Bass Solo" (Stuart Hamm) – 6:28
 "The Mystical Potato Head Groove Thing" – 6:24
 "Always with Me, Always with You" – 3:50
 "Big Bad Moon" – 6:32
 "Friends" – 4:07
 "Surfing with the Alien" – 9:17
 "Rubina" – 8:08

Personnel
Joe Satriani – Guitar, Harmonica, Vocals 
Jeff Campitelli – Percussion and Drums
Stuart Hamm – Bass
Eric Caudieux – Keyboards and rhythm guitar

Charts

Certifications

References

Joe Satriani live albums
2001 live albums